Acraea comor is a butterfly in the family Nymphalidae. It is found on the Comoros.

Taxonomy
It is a member of the Acraea jodutta  species group    -   but see also Pierre & Bernaud, 2014

References

Butterflies described in 1992
comor
Endemic fauna of the Comoros